An enacting clause is a short phrase that introduces the main provisions of a law enacted by a legislature. It is also called enacting formula or enacting words. It usually declares the source from which the law claims to derive its authority. In many countries, an enacting formula is not considered necessary and is simply omitted.

The simplest enacting clauses merely cite the legislature by which the law has been adopted; for example the enacting clause used in Australia since 1990 is "The Parliament of Australia enacts." Alternatively an enacting clause may invoke the ultimate sovereign. For example, California, based on the principle of popular sovereignty, has the following enacting clause: "The People of the State of California do enact as follows."

National legislatures

Antigua and Barbuda
Parliament of Antigua and Barbuda:

Argentina
Congress of Argentina:

Australia
Parliament of Australia:

For constitutional amendments passed at a referendum:

1973 - October 1990:

 

1901–1972:

Austria
National Council:

Bangladesh
Jatiya Sangsad:

Barbados
Parliament of Barbados:
1969: 
2020:
 
For bills amending the constitution:

Bahamas
Parliament of the Bahamas:

Belgium

In Belgium the enacting formula appears in the Belgian official journal (Belgisch Staatsbald/Moniteur belge) when the law is promulgated and published, but is usually thereafter not included when the law is printed in compilations, or stored in internet databases, even official ones. The enacting clause is as follows.

Belize
Parliament of Belize:

Brazil
National Congress of Brazil:

In Brazil the presidential assent to a bill is called "sanction". After passing both Houses of Congress (the Chamber of Deputies and the Federal Senate), the final version of the bill, duly signed by the presiding officers of both Houses, is sent to the President of the Republic. The document is still called a "proposed law", with a bill number, and with the header "The National Congress decrees:" (In Portuguese: "O Congresso Nacional decreta:"). If the President approves the bill, a different copy of the act is prepared by the Presidency of the Republic, with the official number of the Law and the date of enactment of the law, and also with the replacement of the clause "The National Congress decrees:" with the above mentioned formula "THE PRESIDENT OF THE REPUBLIC: I make it known that the National Congress decrees and I sanction the following Law:". The signatures of the presiding officers of Congress are therefore not present in this version of the act. This is the version of the statute that is published in the Official Journal and that is included in the statute books. When granting his approval to a bill, the President signs both the bill sent to him by Congress and the final version of the statute with the presidential enacting formula. The signed Bill is returned to Congress by means of a presidential message; the signed statute with the presidential enacting formula is printed in the Official Journal, and the original is thereafter sent to the National Archive. Thus, in Brazil, the President is always seen signing two different documents at bill signing ceremony (the two documents are called the "autographs"): one is the text of the proposed law, the other is the final text of the statute. Technically, the first signature (on the autograph of the Bill sent by Congress) is the "sanction to the proposed law", that is, the approval of the bill, that transforms it in a Law, and the second signature (on the final version of the statute with the presidential enacting formula and a law number) is the promulgation, the announcement to the people that the Law has been adopted. While the signature of the President on the bill includes the addition of the formula "I sanction it" (in Portuguese: "Sanciono") above the signature, this is not seen in the final "promulgation" autograph of the statute. On the other hand, the promulgated statute contains not only the signature of the president, but also the countersignatures of his ministers principally charged with applying the law.

When the president vetoes a bill, and the veto is overridden, the Bill is returned by Congress to the President not for sanction (approval), but merely for promulgation. In that case, the president is expected to promulgate the bill in 48 hours. In that situation, the enacting formula that appears in the final text of the adopted statute is as follows:

Tacit sanction (i.e. implicit approval) is deemed to take place if the president fails to sign or veto a bill within the constitutionally mandated timeframe of fifteen working days from receiving the bill. Once the bill is considered implicitly sanctioned, the president is expected to promulgate the new law and the same 48-hour timeframe applies. The formula in this case is:

Should the president refuse to promulgate, or fail to promulgate in the period of 48 hours, a bill, after his veto has been overridden by Congress, then the authority to promulgate the bill passes to the President of the Senate. In that case, the formula of promulgation is:

Should the president of the Republic refuse to promulgate, or fail to promulgate in the period of 48 hours, a bill, after the bill has been implicitly sanctioned due to his failure to sign or veto it within the constitutionally mandated timeframe, then the authority to promulgate the bill passes to the President of the Senate. In that case, the formula of promulgation is:

Whenever the president adopts a provisional measure and the provisional measure is approved by Congress with changes, a normal bill is sent to the president for approval or veto, and the same formulas used for other bills are employed; once enacted, the new statute replaces the provisional measure. However, if the provisional measure adopted by the president is approved by Congress without changes, the bill does not need to be presented for approval or veto; in that case, the law that both corresponds fully to the provisional measure and replaces it is promulgated directly by the President of the Senate, with the following words:

Historical: General Assembly of the Empire of Brazil (1822-1889)

Whenever the General Assembly of the Empire (made up of a Senate and of a Chamber of Deputies) passed a bill, a decree of the General Assembly containing the articles of the approved bill was sent to the Emperor for sanction or veto. The Decree of the General Assembly began with the following formula (that did not appear in the final version of the statute, after the imperial sanction): "The General Assembly decrees:" (in Portuguese: "A Assembleia Geral decreta:"). The decree was still only a proposed law, that would become an actual law if sanctioned by the Emperor. The General Assembly sent its decree to the Emperor for sanction or veto by means of a message with the words following: "The General Assembly sends to the Emperor the enclosed decree, that it considers advantageous, and useful to the Empire, and it asks that His Imperial Majesty may be pleased to grant it His sanction" (in Portuguese: "A Assembleia Geral dirige ao Imperador o decreto incluso, que julga vantajoso e útil ao Império, e pede a Sua Majestade Imperial, se digne dar a Sua sanção"). If the Emperor decided to sanction the decree, then he sent the message of the General Assembly back to the Legislature, adding after the text of the Decree of the General Assembly the following words, together with the date and his signature: ""The Emperor consents" (in Portuguese: "O Imperador consente"). Then, the Executive branch prepared a formal document to promulgate the new law, and this document was known in the imperial period as a Charter of Law (in Portuguese: Carta de Lei). It was the chartered version of the law that was included in the statute books and that was printed and published for the knowledge of the people. Thus, the Charter of Law was the final version of the statute as adopted. It was signed by the Emperor and countersigned by his responsible Ministers, and contained an enacting formula as follows:

When the powers of the Emperor were discharged by Regents on behalf of the monarch the formula was as follows:

Canada
Parliament of Canada:

The enacting clause for money bills differs. For example, in the Appropriation Act No. 4, 2015–16, it reads as follows:

Chile
National Congress of Chile:

Colombia
Congress of Colombia:

Croatia
Hrvatski sabor:

Words "Hrvatski sabor" (Croatian Parliament) are printed in uppercase as a header on all laws, thereby starting the enacting clause and symbolizing that there is no authority higher than the Parliament. This might be rooted in a popular quote from Ante Starčević in a parliamentary discussion in June 1861, as he stated that there is no-one above the parliamentary sovereignty (other than God and the people of Croatia). A brief statement follows, signed by the President of Croatia, promulgating the law, referring to his constitutional right to do so and the session of the parliament where the legislation has been passed.

Denmark
The Danish Folketing:

Dominica
Parliament  of Dominica:

Finland
Parliament of Finland (from 1917 onwards):

Ordinary Acts (enacted in accordance with § 72 of the Constitution):

Acts containing a limited derogation from the Constitution (enacted in accordance with § 73 of the Constitution):

Acts concerning the Evangelical Lutheran Church of Finland:

Before 1917 (examples):

Fiji
Parliament of Fiji:

France
Parliament of France:

Germany
Bundestag of Germany:

For acts which do not need the consent of the Bundesrat:

For acts which need the consent of the Bundesrat:

For acts which need an absolute majority and the consent of the Bundesrat:

For acts that change the Basic Law:

All laws conclude with the following formula before the place and date of signature, the signature of the Federal President and the countersignatures of the Federal Chancellor and of the Federal Ministers responsible for the subject-matter of the law:

Greece
Hellenic Parliament:

Normal Lawmaking
According to the current Constitution of Greece (since March, 1986) each law is approved by the Parliament and promulgated by the President of the Republic.

Before the first amendment of the current Constitution of Greece  (until March, 1986) each law had to be approved by the Parliament and then to be ratified and promulgated by the President of the Republic.

Under the presidential parliamentary Constitution of 1927 and since the Senate's formation in June, 1929, each law had to be approved by the Chamber of Deputies and the Senate and then to be promulgated by the President of Republic.

 While, until Senate's formation:

 And during the Fourth National Assembly at Athens held between January, 1924 and September, 1925:

Also, during constitutional monarchy regime, under the Constitutions of 1864 (as amended in 1911 and re-enacted in 1935) and 1952, each law had to be approved by both the Parliament and the King and then promulgated by the later.

 Especially, under the Constitution of 1844, each law had to be approved by the Chamber of Deputies, the Senate and the King and then promulgated by the last.

Lawmaking under the state of emergency
In case of extremely urgent unforeseen situations, the Constitution grants the Greek government along with the President of the Republic to issue legislative acts bypassing the parliamentary approval, in order to deal with urgent issues, provided that act to be later submitted for sanction in Parliament within forty days after either its promulgation or the parliamentary session convocation, in order to acquire legal power.

Under the previous presidential parliamentary Constitutions, Emergency laws and legislative decrees were enacted by the following clause:

 Especially, during Second Hellenic Republic period, emergency laws and legislative decrees were enacted by the following clause:

During the Kingdom of Greece period, emergency laws and legislative decrees were enacted by the following clause:

 Especially, under 1952 Constitution, the legislative decrees were promulgated only during the absence of Parliament-in-session with consent of a special parliamentary committee, consisted of a fixed by law number of MPs appointed in advance at the start of each session.

Constitutional and Parliament Regulation amendments
Currently, any amendment of the Constitution Law must be published in the official government gazette of the Hellenic Republic, directly ordered by the Speaker of the Parliament.

Likewise, any amendment of the Work Regulation Law of the Hellenic Parliament must be published in the official government gazette of the Hellenic Republic, directly ordered by the Speaker of the Parliament.

Presidential and Royal decrees

The President of Hellenic Republic is the sole authorized state official to promulgate decrees, according to the current Constitution. In case of President's absence/incapacity/retirement, the decrees are leggaly promulgated by the President of the Parliament, performing as Acting President of the Republic.

 Especially, during Second Hellenic Republic period:

During the Kingdom of Greece period, the clause of the equivalent Royal decrees, issued only by the King or the authorized regent, was:

Other Acts
Acts issued by the Cabinet, being inferior than decrees, enact secondary legislation. Distinctively, various Constituent Acts (i.e. constitutional amendentments without parliamentary approval), occasionally issued for politically transitional periods (and sometimes be submitted for sanction by the next National Assembly, in order to be formal constitutional amendements), are also enacted like:

Grenada

Parliament of Grenada:
1967−1979, 1985−present:

Governor-General and the Advisory Council of Grenada:
1983−1984:

People's Revolutionary Government:
1979−1983:

Guyana
Parliament of Guyana:

India
Parliament of India:

Indonesia 

Indonesian laws have a preamble stating the aims of the law and the clauses of the Constitution relevant to the law. The enacting clause is both before and after the preamble.

People's Representative Council:

Before 2000, the phrase after the preamble was as follows:

Ireland
The Oireachtas (parliament of the Republic of Ireland):

Standard:
Since 1937:

1922-1937:

For an act with a preamble:
Since 1937:

1922-1937:

Israel
Currently, Israel does not use enacting clauses in its final laws, but a pseudo-enacting clause is usually printed at the beginning of bills:

However, the Law and Administration Ordinance did have an enacting clause:

Italy

Italian laws are published in the Gazzetta Ufficiale (the official gazette) with the following enacting clause:

After the text of the law itself, the enacting clause continues:

After this concluding clause, the place and date of signature follow. Then the signature of the President of the Republic (printed in capital letters when the law is published in the Gazette) and the counter-signatures of the President of the Council of Ministers (the Prime Minister) and of the keeper of the State Seal (an office held by the Minister of Justice). Those counter-signatures are printed in normal letters when the law is published in the Gazette. The keeper of the State seal counter-signs the law when sealing it.

Thereafter, this enacting clause is usually omitted when the law is reprinted in internet compilations or legal books.

Jamaica
Parliament of Jamaica:

Kiribati
Maneaba ni Maungatabu:

Lebanon
Parliament of Lebanon:

Malaysia
Parliament of Malaysia:

Since 1998:

Before 1998:

Special laws invoking Article 149 of the Constitution of Malaysia:

Special laws invoking Article 149 of the Constitution of Malaysia (Before 1998):

Malta
Parliament of Malta:
Since 1974:

Mexico
After approving laws, Congress issues them as a decree in the manner stablished by Article 70 of the Constitution. Congress then sends the decree to the President for him to assent or veto the law. If the President grants assent to the law, he then issues a decree formally enacting it. Decrees are published in the Official Journal of the Federation (Diario Oficial de la Federación).

Congress of the Union:

Moldova
Parliament of the Republic of Moldova:

Namibia
Parliament of the Republic of Namibia:

Nauru
Parliament of Nauru:

Netherlands
Estates-General of the Netherlands:

The text in Dutch is:

New Zealand
Parliament of New Zealand:

1986–1999:

Before 1986:

Nigeria
Nigerian National Assembly:

Pakistan
Parliament of Pakistan:

Papua New Guinea
National Parliament of Papua New Guinea

Paraguay
Congress of Paraguay:

Philippines
Congress of the Philippines

1987 Constitution:

Bills:

Joint Resolutions:

Peru
Congress of Peru:

Portugal

The enacting clauses used in Portuguese legislation are determined by the Lei formulária (Formulary Law, Law no. 74/98).

President of the Republic
 General presidential decrees

 Ratification of an international treaty

Assembly of the Republic:
 Laws

 Resolutions

Government
 Executive laws

OR

OR

All laws conclude with the date of approval by the respective legislative body and the signature of its presiding  member (either the President of the Assembly of the Republic or the Prime Minister), followed by the formula of promulgation by the President of the Republic. This formula of promulgation is very simple, consisting only of the clause "Let it be published" (in Portuguese: Publique-se), followed by the date of promulgation by the President of the Republic and the presidential signature (the name of the Head of State is printed in capital letters when the law is published). After the signature of the President, the counter-signature of the Prime Minister follows (preceded by the date of the counter-signature), and the name of the Prime Minister is printed in normal letters when the law is published. No law can enter into force before being officially published in the Diário da República (Diary of the Republic).

Romania
Parliament of Romania:

1965–1989:

1948–1965:

1881–1947:

South Africa
Parliament of South Africa:
Since 27 April 1994:
 or 

The Constitution of South Africa, not being a conventional Act of Parliament, does not contain an enacting formula per se. Its preamble does, however, contain the words  In the context, "we" refers to the people of South Africa.

3 September 1984 to 27 April 1994:
For "general affairs" acts:

For "own affairs" acts:

1 January 1981 to 3 September 1984:

31 May 1961 to 1 January 1981:

For acts amending the entrenched clauses of the Constitution of 1961:

31 May 1910 to 31 May 1961:

For acts amending the entrenched clauses of the South Africa Act 1909:

Spain
Cortes Generales of Spain:

For Constitutions:

For organic acts:

Saint Kitts and Nevis
Parliament of Saint Kitts and Nevis:

Saint Lucia
Parliament of Saint Lucia:

1979−1988:

Since 1988:

Saint Vincent and the Grenadines
House of Assembly of Saint Vincent and the Grenadines:

Singapore
Parliament of Singapore:

Solomon Islands
National Parliament of the Solomon Islands:

Swaziland
Parliament of Swaziland

Sweden 
Riksdag

Switzerland
Swiss Federal Assembly:

Trinidad and Tobago
Parliament of Trinidad and Tobago:
Since 1976:

1962−1976:

Thailand
National Assembly of Thailand:

Constitution:

Act:

Royal Degree & Emergency Decree:

Royal Command:

Tuvalu
Parliament of Tuvalu:

United Kingdom
Parliament of the United Kingdom of Great Britain and Northern Ireland:

For money bills:

Under the Parliament Acts 1911 and 1949:

An enacting clause may be preceded by an explanatory preamble of "whereas" clauses, e.g. for the Chequers Estate Act 1917.

Until the 19th century each later section of an act repeated an abbreviated version of the formula used in the first section, typically "and be it further enacted by the authority aforesaid". The first revised edition of the statutes omitted these formulae to save space, while printing the primary enacting clause. The Statute Law Revision Act 1888 deleted these formulae from many unrepealed acts.

United States
Congress of the United States

Bills:

Joint Resolutions (have the same effect as bills):

Vanuatu
Parliament of Vanuatu

Venezuela
National Assembly of Venezuela:

Zimbabwe
Parliament of Zimbabwe:

Former legislatures
Allied Control Council:

Congress of the Confederate States:

Acts of the Governor General of India in Council:

Parliament of Rhodesia:

Legislature of the Government of the Ryukyu Islands:

Territorial legislatures

Hong Kong
 Legislative Council of Hong Kong
 Before 1997: 
"BE it enacted by the Governor of Hongkong, with the advice of the Legislative Council thereof, as follows:-"
"BE it enacted by the Governor of Hong Kong, with the advice and consent of the Legislative Council thereof, as follows:-()
"Enacted by the Governor of Hong Kong, with the advice and consent of the Legislative Council thereof."()
 1997–1998: "Enacted by the Provisional Legislative Council."
 After 1998: "Enacted by the Legislative Council."
 After 1998 (with preamble): "NOW, THEREFORE, it is enacted by the Legislative Council as follows—"

Macau
 Legislative Assembly of Macau:
Before 1999:
"The Legislative Assembly decrees, pursuant to the terms of article X of the Organic Statute of Macau, that the following shall be enforced as law:-"

After 1999:
"The Legislative Assembly decrees, pursuant to the terms of article 71, paragraph 1) of the Basic Law of the Macao Special Administrative Region, that the following shall be enforced as law:-"

 Chief Executive of Macau (Administrative regulations):
"The Chief Executive, after consulting the Executive Council, decrees, pursuant to the terms of article 50, paragraph 5) of the Basic Law of the Macao Special Administrative Region, enacts this independent/supplementary administrative regulation:-"

 Governor of Macau (Decree-laws):
"The Legislative Assembly decrees, pursuant to the terms of article X of the Organic Statute of Macau, that the following shall be enforced as law:-"

British crown dependencies
 Tynwald of the Isle of Man: "BE IT ENACTED by the King's [Queen's] Most Excellent Majesty, by and with the advice and consent of the Council and Keys in Tynwald assembled, and by the authority of the same, as follows:–"
 States of Jersey:   "THE STATES, subject to the sanction of His [Her] Most Excellent Majesty in Council, have adopted the following Law –"
  Bailiwick-wide laws:  "THE STATES, in pursuance of their Resolution[s] of DATE, have approved the following provisions which, subject to the Sanction of Her [His] Most Excellent Majesty in Council, shall have force of law in the Bailiwick of Guernsey."

 States of Guernsey:  "THE STATES, in pursuance of their Resolution[s] of DATE, have approved the following provisions which, subject to the Sanction of Her [His] Most Excellent Majesty in Council, shall have force of law in the Island[s] of Guernsey,[Alderney],[Herm and Jethou]."

 States of Alderney: "THE STATES OF ALDERNEY, in pursuance of their Resolution[s] of DATE, have approved the following provisions which, subject to the Sanction of His [Her] Most Excellent Majesty in Council, shall have force of law in the Island of Alderney."
Chief Pleas of Sark: "THE CHIEF PLEAS OF SARK, in pursuance of their Resolution[s] of DATE, have approved the following provisions which, subject to the Sanction of His [Her] Most Excellent Majesty in Council, shall have force of law in Sark."

British overseas territories

 Anguilla House of Assembly: "ENACTED by the Legislature of Anguilla"
 Ascension Island Council: "Enacted by the Governor of Ascension after consultation with the Island Council of Ascension."
 Parliament of Bermuda: "Be it enacted by The King's [Queen's] Most Excellent Majesty, by and with the advice and consent of the Senate and the House of Assembly of Bermuda, and by the authority of the same, as follows:-"
 House of Assembly of the British Virgin Islands: "ENACTED by the Legislature of the Virgin Islands as follows:-"
 Legislative Assembly of the Cayman Islands: "ENACTED by the Legislature of the Cayman Islands."
 Legislative Assembly of the Falkland Islands: "ENACTED by the Legislature of the Falkland Islands ⎯"
 Gibraltar Parliament: "ENACTED by the Legislature of Gibraltar:-"
 Legislative Assembly of Montserrat: "Be it enacted by The King's [Queen's] Most Excellent Majesty, by and with the advice and consent of the Legislative Assembly of Montserrat, and by the authority of the same as follows:–".
 Pitcairn Island Council: "Enacted by the Governor of the Islands of Pitcairn, Henderson, Ducie and Oeno"
 Legislative Council of Saint Helena:"Enacted by the Governor of St Helena with the advice and consent of the Legislative Council of St Helena."
 Administrator of the Sovereign Base Areas of Akrotiri and Dhekelia: "BE it enacted by the Administrator of the Sovereign Base Areas of Akrotiri and Dhekelia as follows:-"
 Turks and Caicos Islands House of Assembly: "ENACTED by the Legislature of the Turks and Caicos Islands"

Subnational legislatures

Australia

Australian Capital Territory Legislative Assembly: "The Legislative Assembly for the Australian Capital Territory enacts as follows:"
Parliament of New South Wales: "The Legislature of New South Wales enacts:"
Northern Territory Legislative Assembly: "The Legislative Assembly of the Northern Territory enacts as follows:"
Parliament of Queensland: "The Parliament of Queensland enacts–"
 Before 1922: "BE it enacted by the King's Most Excellent Majesty, by and with the advice and consent of the Legislative Council and Legislative Assembly of Queensland in Parliament assembled, and by the authority of the same, as follows."
Before 1993: "BE IT ENACTED by the Queen's [King's] Most Excellent Majesty, by and with the advice and consent of the Queensland Legislative Assembly in Parliament assembled, and by the authority of the same, as follows."
Parliament of South Australia: "The Parliament of South Australia enacts as follows:"
Parliament of Tasmania: "Be it enacted by His [Her] Excellency the Governor of Tasmania, by and with the advice and consent of the Legislative Council and House of Assembly, in Parliament assembled, as follows:"
Parliament of Victoria: "The Parliament of Victoria enacts:"
Parliament of Western Australia: "The Parliament of Western Australia enacts as follows:"

Canada
 Legislative Assembly of Alberta: "HIS [HER] MAJESTY, by and with the advice and consent of the Legislative Assembly of Alberta, enacts as follows:"
 Legislative Assembly of British Columbia: "HIS [HER] MAJESTY, by and with the advice and consent of the Legislative Assembly of the Province of British Columbia, enacts as follows:" 
 Legislative Assembly of Manitoba: "HIS [HER] MAJESTY, by and with the advice and consent of the Legislative Assembly of Manitoba, enacts as follows:"
 Legislative Assembly of New Brunswick: "HIS [HER] Majesty, by and with the advice and consent of the Legislative Assembly of New Brunswick, enacts as follows:"
 Newfoundland and Labrador House of Assembly: "Be it enacted by the Lieutenant-Governor and House of Assembly in Legislative Session convened, as follows:" 
 Legislative Assembly of the Northwest Territories: "The Commissioner of the Northwest Territories, by and with the advice and consent of the Legislative Assembly, enacts as follows:"
 Legislative Assembly of Nova Scotia: "Be it enacted by the Governor and Assembly as follows:"
 Legislative Assembly of Nunavut: "The Commissioner of Nunavut, by and with the advice and consent of the Legislative Assembly, enacts as follows:"
 Legislative Assembly of Ontario: "HIS [HER] Majesty, by and with the advice and consent of the Legislative Assembly of the Province of Ontario, enacts as follows:"
 Legislative Assembly of Prince Edward Island: "BE IT ENACTED by the Lieutenant Governor and the Legislative Assembly of the Province of Prince Edward Island as follows:"
 National Assembly of Quebec: "The Parliament of Québec enacts as follows:"
 Legislative Assembly of Saskatchewan: "HIS [HER] MAJESTY, by and with the advice and consent of the Legislative Assembly of Saskatchewan, enacts as follows:"
 Yukon Legislative Assembly: "The Commissioner of Yukon, by and with the advice and consent of the Legislative Assembly, enacts as follows:"

New Zealand

Provincial councils (abolished in 1876)
 Canterbury Provincial Council: "Be it enacted by the Superintendent of the Province of Canterbury, by and with the advice and consent of the Provincial Council thereof, as follows:—"

Philippines

Sangguniang Panlalawigan
 Sangguniang Panlalawigan of Aklan: "BE IT ENACTED by the Honorable Sangguniang Panlalawigan of Aklan that:"
 Sangguniang Panlalawigan of Bataan: "BE IT ENACTED by the Sangguniang Panlalawigan of Bataan;"
 Sangguniang Panlalawigan of Bohol: "Be it enacted by the Sangguniang Panlalawigan of the Province of Bohol in session duly assembled –"
 Resolutions: "BE IT RESOLVED, as it is hereby resolved by the Sangguniang Panlalawigan of the Province of Bohol in session duly assembled –"
 Sangguniang Panlalawigan of Bukidnon: "BE IT ORDAINED by the Honorable Sangguniang Panlalawigan, Province of Bukidnon, this [day] of [month], in the Year of Our Lord, [year]:"
 Alternative: "BE IT ORDAINED, by the Sangguniang Panlalawigan of Bukidnon, this [day] of [month], in the Year of Our Lord, [year], that:"
 Sangguniang Panlalawigan of Bulacan: "Be it enacted by the Sangguniang Panlalawigan in session assembled:"
 Sangguniang Panlalawigan of Cagayan: "NOW THEREFORE, be it resolved by this Body in session assembled to enact:"
 Sangguniang Panlalawigan of Camarines Norte: "BE IT ORDAINED by the Honorable Sangguniang Panlalawigan that:"
 Sangguniang Panlalawigan of Cavite: "Now therefore, be it enacted by the Sangguniang Panlalawigan in session assembled that:"
 Sangguniang Panlalawigan of Cebu: "The Sangguniang Panlalawigan of Cebu, hereby ORDAINS, that:"
 Sangguniang Panlalawigan of Compostela Valley: "Be it ordained by the Sangguniang Panlalawigan, Compostela Valley Province, in Session Assembled that:"
 Sangguniang Panlalawigan of Cotabato: "Be it ordained by the Sangguniang Panlalawigan of Cotabato in a regular session assembled, THAT:"
 Sangguniang Panlalawigan of Eastern Samar: "Be it ordained by the Sangguniang Panlalawigan in its regular session duly assembled at the SP Session Hall, Legislative Building, Borongan, Eastern Samar on [date]."
 Sangguniang Panlalawigan of Ilocos Norte: "NOW, THEREFORE, Be it Ordained, that:"
 Sangguniang Panlalawigan of Iloilo: "BE IT RESOLVED, as it is hereby Resolved, by the Sangguniang Panlalawigan ng Iloilo to enact the following provincial ordinance:"
 Alternative: "BE IT ORDAINED, as it is hereby Ordained, by the Sangguniang Panlalawigan in session assembled, that:"
 Sangguniang Panlalawigan of Isabela: "Be it ordained by the Sangguniang Panlalawigan of Isabela in its regular session duly assembled:"
 Sangguniang Panlalawigan of Leyte: "BE IT ORDAINED by the Sangguniang Panlalawigan in session assembled,"
 Sangguniang Panlalawigan of Misamis Occidental: "Be it ordained, by the Sangguniang Panlalawigan of Misamis Occidental in Session that:"
 Sangguniang Panlalawigan of Northern Samar: "BE IT ORDAINED by the Sangguniang Panlalawigan in session assembled:"
 Sangguniang Panlalawigan of Nueva Vizcaya: "Be it ordained by the Sangguniang Panlalawigan in session assembled that:"
 Sangguniang Panlalawigan of Pampanga: "BE IT ORDAINED BY THE SANGGUNIANG PANLALAWIGAN OF PAMPANGA, in session assembled:"
 Sangguniang Panlalawigan of Pangasinan: "Be it enacted by the Sangguniang Panlalawigan of Pangasinan in session assembled:"
 Resolutions: "RESOLVED, by the Sangguniang Panlalawigan in session assembled"
 Sangguniang Panlalawigan of Rizal: "Be it enacted by the Sangguniang Panlalawigan ng Rizal in a session duly assembled that:"
 Alternative: "Be it enacted by the Sangguniang Panlalawigan of Rizal in Session Assembled:"
 Sangguniang Panlalawigan of Samar: "RESOLVED, as it is hereby resolved, to enact the following:"
 Sangguniang Panlalawigan of South Cotabato: "Be it ordained by the Sangguniang Panlalawigan of South Cotabato that:"
 Sangguniang Panlalawigan of Southern Leyte: "Be it ordained by the Sangguniang Panlalawigan in session assembled."
 Sangguniang Panlalawigan of Zambales: "Now therefore, be it enacted, as it is hereby enacted, by the Sangguniang Panlalawigan of Zambales in a session herein assembled, by virtue of the powers vested in it by law, that:"
 Alternative: "BE IT ORDAINED by the Sangguniang Panlalawigan of Zambales in session assembled that –"
 Sangguniang Panlalawigan of Zamboanga del Norte: "Be it ordained by the Sangguniang Panlalawigan of Zamboanga del Norte in session assembled"

Other legislatures
 Autonomous Region in Muslim Mindanao Regional Legislative Assembly: "Be it enacted by the Regional Assembly in session assembled."
 Metro Manila Council: "NOW, THEREFORE, pursuant to Section 6(d) of RA 7924, this Regulation is hereby adopted and promulgated by the Metro Manila Council, that:"
Alternative: "NOW, THEREFORE, be it enacted by the Metro Manila Council, that:"
Ordinances: "NOW THEREFORE, be it ordained by the Metro Manila Council pursuant to Section 4 of Executive Order No. 392 that:"

Saint Kitts and Nevis
Nevis Island Assembly:"BE IT ENACTED by the King's [Queen's] Most Excellent Majesty, by and with the advice and consent of the Nevis Island Assembly and by the authority of the same, as follows:–"

United Kingdom

Devolved institutions
 Northern Ireland Assembly: "BE IT ENACTED by being passed by the Northern Ireland Assembly and assented to by His [Her] Majesty as follows:"
 Scottish Parliament: Acts of the Scottish Parliament do not begin with a conventional enacting clause. Instead they begin with a phrase that reads: "The Bill for this Act of the Scottish Parliament was passed by the Parliament on [Date] and received Royal Assent on [Date]"
 Senedd (since 2020):
Acts in the English language: "Having been passed by Senedd Cymru and having received the assent of His [Her] Majesty, it is enacted as follows:-"
Acts in the Welsh language: "Gan ei fod wedi ei basio gan Senedd Cymru ac wedi derbyn cydsyniad Ei Fawrhydi [Ei Mawrhydi], deddfir fel a ganlyn:-"
 National Assembly for Wales (2006–2020):
Acts in the English language: "Having been passed by the National Assembly for Wales and having received the assent of Her Majesty, it is enacted as follows:—"
Acts in the Welsh language: "Gan ei fod wedi ei basio gan Gynulliad Cenedlaethol Cymru a chael cysyniad Ei Mawrhydi, deddfir fel a ganlyn:—"
Measures in the English language: "This Measure, passed by the National Assembly for Wales on [Date] and approved by Her Majesty in Council on [Date], enacts the following provisions:—"
Measures in the Welsh language: "Mae'r Mesur hwn, a basiwyd gan Gynulliad Cenedlaethol Cymru ar [Dyddiad] ac a gymeradwywyd gan Ei Mawrhydi yn Ei Chyngor ar [Dyddiad], yn deddfu'r darpariaethau a ganlyn:—"

Former legislatures
 Parliament of Northern Ireland (1921–1972): "BE it enacted by the Queen's [King's] most Excellent Majesty, and the Senate and the House of Commons of Northern Ireland in this present Parliament assembled, and by the authority of the same, as follows:-"

United States

State legislatures
 Alabama Legislature: "Be it enacted by the Legislature of Alabama"
 Alaska Legislature: "Be it enacted by the Legislature of the State of Alaska"
 Arizona State Legislature: "Be it enacted by the Legislature of the State of Arizona,"
 Arkansas General Assembly: "Be it enacted by the General Assembly of the State of Arkansas."
 California State Legislature: "The People of the State of California do enact as follows:"
 Colorado General Assembly: "Be it enacted by the General Assembly of the State of Colorado:"
For bills adopted by referendum, "Be it enacted by the People of the State of Colorado:"
 Connecticut General Assembly: "Be it enacted by the Senate and House of Representatives in General Assembly convened:"
 Delaware General Assembly: "Be it enacted by the General Assembly of the State of Delaware"
 Florida Legislature: "Be It enacted by the Legislature of the State of Florida:"
 Georgia General Assembly: "Be it enacted by the General Assembly of Georgia"
 Hawaii State Legislature: "Be it enacted by the Legislature of the State of Hawaii:"
 Idaho Legislature: "Be it enacted by the Legislature of the State of Idaho"
 Illinois General Assembly: "Be it enacted by the People of the State of Illinois, represented in the General Assembly"
 Indiana General Assembly: "Be it enacted by the General Assembly of the State of Indiana"
 Iowa General Assembly: "Be it enacted by the General Assembly of the State of Iowa"
 Kansas Legislature: "Be it enacted by the Legislature of the State of Kansas"
 Kentucky General Assembly: "Be it enacted by the General Assembly of the Commonwealth of Kentucky"
 Louisiana Legislature: "Be it enacted by the Legislature of Louisiana."
 Maine Legislature: "Be it enacted by the People of the State of Maine as follows:"
 Maryland General Assembly: "Be it enacted by the General Assembly of Maryland"
 Massachusetts General Court: "Be it enacted by the Senate and House of Representatives in General Court assembled, and by the authority of the same, as follows:"
 Michigan Legislature: "The People of the State of Michigan enact:"
 Minnesota Legislature: "Be it enacted by the Legislature of the State of Minnesota"
 Mississippi Legislature: "Be it enacted by the Legislature of the state of Mississippi"
 Missouri General Assembly: "Be it enacted by the General Assembly of the State of Missouri, as follows"
 Montana Legislature: "Be it enacted by the Legislature of the State of Montana"
 Nebraska Legislature: "Be it enacted by the people of the State of Nebraska"
 Nevada Legislature: "The People of the State of Nevada, represented in Senate and Assembly, do enact as follows"
For acts passed by popular initiative, "The People of the State of Nevada do enact as follows"
 New Hampshire General Court: "Be it Enacted by the Senate and House of Representatives in General Court convened:"
 New Jersey Legislature: "Be It Enacted by the Senate and General Assembly of the State of New Jersey:" 
 New Mexico Legislature: "Be it enacted by the legislature of the state of New Mexico"
 New York Legislature: "The People of the State of New York, represented in Senate and Assembly, do enact as follows,"
 North Carolina General Assembly: "The General Assembly of North Carolina enacts:"
 North Dakota Legislative Assembly: "Be it enacted by the Legislative Assembly of North Dakota"
 Ohio General Assembly: "Be it enacted by the general assembly of the state of Ohio" (sic)
 Oklahoma Legislature: "Be it enacted By the People of the State of Oklahoma"
 Oregon Legislative Assembly: "Be It Enacted by the People of the State of Oregon:"
 Pennsylvania General Assembly: "The General Assembly of the Commonwealth of Pennsylvania hereby enacts as follows:"
 Rhode Island General Assembly: "It is enacted by the General Assembly as follows:"
 South Carolina General Assembly:  "Be it enacted by the General Assembly of the State of South Carolina:"
 South Dakota Legislature: "Be it enacted by the Legislature of the State of South Dakota"
 Tennessee General Assembly: "Be it enacted by the General Assembly of the State of Tennessee"
 Texas Legislature: "Be it enacted by the Legislature of the State of Texas:"
 Utah State Legislature:"Be it enacted by the Legislature of the State of Utah,"
 Vermont General Assembly: "It is hereby enacted by the General Assembly of the State of Vermont:"
 Virginia General Assembly: "Be it enacted by the General Assembly of Virginia"
 Washington State Legislature: "Be it enacted by the Legislature of the State of Washington:"
 West Virginia Legislature: "Be it enacted by the Legislature of West Virginia:"
 Wisconsin Legislature: "The people of the state of Wisconsin, represented in senate and assembly, do enact as follows:"
 Wyoming Legislature: "Be it Enacted by the Legislature of the State of Wyoming:"

D.C. council and territorial legislatures
 District of Columbia Council: "Be it enacted by the Council of the District of Columbia,"
 Virgin Islands Legislature: "Be it enacted by the Legislature of the Virgin Islands,"
 Legislature of Guam: "Be it enacted by the people of Guam"

References

  
  For example: wikisource:nl:Wet op de adeldom (1994) or many others under wikisource:nl:Categorie:Nederlandse wetgeving; for an older example with a male sovereign, see wikisource:nl:Wet algemene bepalingen (1829)
  
  
  
  
  
  
  
  
  
  
  
  
  
  
  
  
  
  
  
  
  
  
  
  
  
  
  
  
  
  
  
  
  
  
  
  
  
  
  
  
  
  
  
  
  
  
  
  
  
  
  
  
  
  

Enacting clause
Enacting clause
Enacting clause